Deroca hyalina is a moth in the family Drepanidae. It was described by Francis Walker in 1855. It is found in India, Myanmar and China.

Subspecies
Deroca hyalina hyalina (India, Myanmar, China: Hong Kong)
Deroca hyalina latizona Watson, 1957 (China: Guangdong, Sichuan, Hunan, Jiangxi, Fujian, Zhejiang)

References

Moths described in 1855
Drepaninae